Bondville is a village in Champaign County, Illinois, United States. The population was 388 at the 2020 census.



Geography
The town of Seymour lies about  further to the west.

Demographics

As of the 2020 census there were 388 people, 220 households, and 110 families residing in the village. The racial makeup of the village was 84.79% White, 2.84% African American, 0.26% Native American, 0.52% Asian, 0.52% from other races, and 11.08% from two or more races. Hispanic or Latino of any race were 3.35% of the population.

There were 220 households, out of which 9.09% had children under the age of 18 living with them, 42.27% were married couples living together, none had a female householder with no husband present, and 50.00% were non-families. 29.09% of all households were made up of individuals, and 7.27% had someone living alone who was 65 years of age or older. The average household size was 2.60 and the average family size was 2.07.

The village's age distribution consisted of 10.8% under the age of 18, 10.1% from 18 to 24, 19.8% from 25 to 44, 37.3% from 45 to 64, and 22.0% who were 65 years of age or older. The median age was 50.3 years. For every 100 females, there were 124.1 males. For every 100 females age 18 and over, there were 113.7 males.

The median income for a household in the village was $53,750, and the median income for a family was $65,000. Males had a median income of $40,298 versus $29,500 for females. The per capita income for the village was $31,857. About 7.3% of families and 10.2% of the population were below the poverty line, including 0.0% of those under age 18 and 9.0% of those age 65 or over.

See also

 List of municipalities in Illinois

References

External links

Villages in Illinois
Villages in Champaign County, Illinois